SS Telefon was a Norwegian cargo steamship of about  built by on the River Tyne in 1900.  She was wrecked in South Shetland Islands in 1908, though later salved, repaired and returned to service.  She was sunk in a collision off Denmark in 1913 as the British Kinneil.

Description
The Telefon was a 1403 gross register ton steel cargo ship built in 1900 by Wood, Skinner & Company Limited at Bill Quay on the River Tyne. She was  length overall,  beam and  depth. Telefon was launched on 30 December 1899. 

Career
The ship was built for P A Grøn of Sandefjord, Norway in 1900 and used to carry cargos to the Antarctic whaling ships of Christen Christensen. On one such voyage, carrying coal and empty barrels from Rotterdam, she struck a reef at the entrance to Admiralty Bay, South Shetland Islands on 26 December 1908. Some sources considered her a total loss as a wreck.

Capt Adolfus Andresen, Norwegian owner of the Sociedad Ballenera de Magallanes of Punta Arenas, Chile which used Deception Island as a whale factory ship base, salved the Telefon, putting her aground at Port Foster, Deception Island, where she was eventually refloated and returned to service with the whaling fleet. 
That resumption of trading was brief as she was acquired in 1910 by The Greenock & Grangemouth Dockyard Co Ltd of Greenock, transferred to the British flag and registered at Grangemouth. The following year she was sold to the Lovart Steamship Co Ltd, Glasgow, under the management of Love, Stewart & Co, Bo'ness, who renamed her Kinneil

Fate
The crew of 18 and the one passenger on board were all rescued.

Legacy
Telefon Bay where she was beached awaiting repair in 1909 and the adjacent Telefon Ridge, on Deception Island, in the South Sandwich Islands of Antarctica are both named after the ship.

References

External links
Photograph of SS Teflon

1899 ships
Merchant ships of Chile
Merchant ships of Norway
Merchant ships of the United Kingdom
Steamships of Norway
Steamships of the United Kingdom
Ships built on the River Tyne
Steamships of Chile